The Mourlot family has been closely associated with the arts since 1852. The family ran Mourlot Studios, also known as Imprimerie Mourlot, Ateliers Mourlot and Mourlot Freres.

Family members
Francois Mourlot (1828–1902), lithographic printer.
Jules Mourlot (1850–1921), son of Francois and founder of the Imprimerie Mourlot, aka. Mourlot Studios
Fernand Mourlot(1895–1988), son of Jules, director of Mourlot Studios and founder of Editions Mourlot
Georges Mourlot (1889), son of Jules Mourlot
, son of Jules Mourlot and painter
Jeanne Mourlot, Wife of Fernand
Roland Bennard, son of Jeanne Mourlot
Jacques Mourlot(1933), son of Fernand and Founder of the Mourlot Studios in New York
Nicole Bordas (1925), daughter of Fernand
Eric Mourlot (1970), son of Jacques and grandson of Fernand, founder of Galerie Mourlot, New York
Frank Bordas, son of Pierre Bordas and founder of Atelier Bordas

French families